Bedia Özgökçe Ertan (born 6 January 1975 in Van) is a lawyer and a politician from the Peoples' Democratic Party (HDP), a former member of the Turkish Grand National Assembly and Mayor of Van.

Education and professional career 
After her graduation from the Law Faculty of the Dokuz Eylül University in Izmir, she began to be involved as a defender of human rights at the Van branch of the Turkish Human Rights Association (IHD) and also the Van Bar Association.

Political career 
In the local elections of 2004 she was elected to the council of Van and represented the Democratic Peoples' Party (DEHAP). In the parliamentarian elections of November 2015, she was elected as a Member of Parliament for Van representing the HDP.  She opposes war and was charged of "disseminating terror propaganda" for social media posts which opposed to the Turkish military operation in Afrin, Syria in March 2018. In the  parliamentarian elections of June 2018 she was re-elected as an Member of Parliament for Van representing the HDP. During her political career she was charged seven times with making propaganda for a terrorist organization, but was not sentenced for it. She was elected a board member of the Progressive Alliance, an association of socialist and social democratic parties in November 2019.

Mayor of Van 
In the local election of March 2019, Özgökçe Ertan was elected Mayor of Van. On the 19 August 2019, she was dismissed from her office together with the Mayors of Diyarbakir, Adnan Selçuk Mizrakli and the mayor of Mardin, Ahmet Türk. The Turkish Interior Minister Süleyman Soylu alleged the mayors had illegally supported the Kurdistan Workers' Party (PKK) and their dismissal was in line with  Art. 127 of the Turkish constitution. The protests which arose were dispersed with water cannons by the Turkish police. In October 2019 a judge accepted an indictment for Özgökçe Ertan, and prosecuted her for being a "member of an armed terror organization". She is facing a prison term of 30 years.

After her dismissal, Parliamentary Group of the European United Left–Nordic Green Left in the European Parliament condemned the treatment of the Kurdish mayors by the Government of the Justice and Development Party (AKP) headed by President Recep Tayyip Erdogan.

Exile 
In November 2020, it was reported that she was now living in exile in Greece and that Frank Mentrup, the Mayor of Karlsruhe, supported her emigration to Germany as Turkey invalidated her Turkish passport.

Personal life 
She is married and has three children.

References 

Peoples' Democratic Party (Turkey) politicians
Mayors of places in Turkey
Turkish human rights activists
1975 births
Living people